Chenar Kheyri (also Romanized as Chenār Kheyrī) is a village in Koregah-e Sharqi Rural District, in the Central District of Khorramabad County, Lorestan Province, Iran. At the 2006 census, its population was 172, in 36 families.

References 

Towns and villages in Khorramabad County